The March For the Beloved(임을 위한 행진곡,임을 爲한 行進曲) is a Korean protest song that was composed in 1981 for the soul wedding of Democracy activist Yoon Sang-won and labor activist Park Ki-soon who were sacrificed during Gwangju Uprising. The original author of the lyrics is Baek Ki-wan, and the composer is Kim Jong-ryul.

History
In 1981, novelist Hwang Sok-yong and musician Kim Jong-ryul(who was a student at Chonnam National University at the time) and 15 Noraepae(musical groups that composed minjunggayos) in the Gwangju region jointly created the song. The song was inserted in a "song play" (musical) called the <Excitement - Wedding of Light>. This song play was dedicated to the soul wedding of  Yoon Sang-won(Spokesperson for the civil army during the Gwangju uprising) and labor activist Park Ki-soon who died while running the 'Deulbul Night School'(A night school that taught labor laws to the workers) at the end of 1978 at the labor site. Yoon Sang-won and Park Ki-soon worked together at Deulbul Night School. March for the Beloved was composed to be used as a chorus to decorate the end of the song play. The song was written by Kim Jong-ryul at Hwang Seok-young's house in Gwangju in May 1981, and the lyrics are based on a long poem called the "Moitbinari-dedicated to the young dancers of the southern lands" composed in prison by civic activist Baek Ki-wan  at Seodaemun Detention Center in December 1980, while he was imprisoned for the  fake wedding at the YMCA incident.which Hwang Seok-young borrowed.
In February 1982, the remains of Yoon Sang-won and Park Ki-soon were transferred to the Mangwol-dong Cemetery in Gwangju (currently the May 18th National Cemetery). It was first released when the soul wedding ceremony was held while putting one's palms together, and the song was quickly circulated as a so-called 'minjunggayo' among labor movement forces through cassette tape copies, sheet music transcriptions, and word of mouth, and became a symbolic representative song of the Gwangju Uprising.

Sheet music 
The song is composed as a march in the minor key, typical of 1980s protest songs in Korea. Initially it was composed in A minor,  but the sheet music in D minor is commonly used.

Usage and international outreach

Minjung rites and domestic protests
The song is used as a song for remembering the gwangju uprising,and is frequently used by labor figures in Korean politics. The rite is called the minjung rite by the labor leaning parties. The song was notably used in protests against president Park keun hye.

International usage
The song is also circulated abroad through migrant workers who returned to Korea after being dispatched to Korea, and it spreads at the Labor Movement sites in each country. It is known that it has been adapted and sung in the local language of Hong Kong, People's Republic of China, Republic of China, Cambodia, Thailand, Malaysia,and Myanmar (Burma).

Taiwan 
In 1988, Ke Zhenglong, executive director of Taiwan Taoyuan Airline Labor Union, went to South Korea to exchange labor movement experience, and heard this "March for You" during the factory strike movement in Mashan City . After returning to Taiwan, he took the car of Zheng Cunqi, a well-known Taiwanese labor activist who was an advisor to the Taoqin trade union at that time, to Shitou Mountain in Hsinchu City to participate in training related to autumn fighting . He mentioned this song to Zheng Cunqi, which impressed him deeply. s song. Under the suggestion of the other party, Ke Zhenglong wrote down the melody from memory, and composed the Chinese version of "Battle Hymn of Laborers ": 130 with Jiang Jintai, a trade union member, and taught them to the trade union members. It was sung in various Taiwanese labor movements: 144 . The "Battle Hymn of Laborers - Song of Gwangju, South Korea" included in the 2008 album "Black Hand Ginseng" by the Black Hand Nakashi Workers Band sings "Battle Hymn of Laborers" written by Ke Zhenglong and Jiang Jintai in Chinese and Korean, and the original version "Dedicated to Your March" also greatly promoted this song in Taiwan. Occupy Taipei Movement in response to Occupy Wall Street in 2011, Hualong Self-Help Association parade in 2014, EVA Air flight attendant strike in 2019  As well as Taiwan's May 1st Labor Day parade  and many other movements over the years, demonstrators sang the "Battle Hymn of Laborers" in chorus. Taiwan's Hsinchu Female Workers Choir also wrote lyrics and sang another version of " Taiwan Laborers' Battle Hymn ".

Hong Kong 
In 1981, the Hong Kong Student Christian Movement (SCMHK), which had been inactive for a period of time, was reorganized and established a close cooperative relationship with Korean youth Christian organizations such as the Korean Christian Student Federation (KSCF) . The two organizations, both of which belong to the World Christian Students Union, collaborated in organizing youth meetings in the 1980s. At this time, South Korea was still in the era of Chun Doo-hwan's rule, and the Korean Federation of Christian Student Unions was a staunch supporter of the democratization movement, and they often sang "March for You" in gatherings with Hong Kong youths. In 1984, Huang Huizhen, a member of SCMHK who was studying at the Divinity School of Chung Chi College, The Chinese University of Hong Kong, was working as a trainee in the Hong Kong Christian Labor Organization. She translated this song into the Cantonese version of " Love's Battle " for labor gatherings. The title or It is the literal translation of the original song's English name "March for Love": 122-123 .

Around 1993, Hong Kong grassroots singer Billy (real name Kong Fanqiang)  who cared about the social movement learned about this song from a friend he met during the movement, and got the score handwritten by Huang Huizhen in 1984: 123, but he thinks the lyrics of this version are out of tune and difficult to sing in Cantonese. In 1998, Billy formed the social movement band Noise Cooperative and heard Taiwan's "Battle Hymn of Labor". The following year, the Noise Cooperative re - wrote and sang a new Cantonese version while retaining the title of " Love 's Battle " . In 2005, during the anti-WTO parade launched by South Korean farmers in Hong Kong, some Hong Kong citizens sang this song to express their support for the South Korean peasant demonstrators [33] [54] . In addition, labor movements such as the May Day parade in Hong Kong in 2015 [55] and the Hoi Lai Village cleaners’ strike in 2017 [56] , as well as the Occupy Central movement in 2014 [57] all featured this song.

On September 27, 2017, to commemorate the third anniversary of the official start of the Occupy Central movement on September 28, 2014, Hong Kong social activist and singer Jin Peiwei re-wrote the lyrics and sang the Cantonese version of " Umbrella March " and uploaded it to her YouTube channel [58] . During the anti-extradition bill movement that broke out in 2019, Jin Peiwei and other demonstrators publicly sang this version of the song many times [59] .

Mainland China 
In the 2007 album "Singing for the Laborers", the Workers' Band Migrant Youth Art Troupe in Mainland China sang "March Dedicated to You" into a Chinese version of "Ode to Laborers ", and the lyricist was Sun Heng, a member of the band. As musicians who are also enthusiastic about the labor movement, the Migrant Youth Art Troupe maintains a good relationship with Taiwan's black hand Nakashi Workers Band [60] and Hong Kong's Noise Cooperative, and it was Billy of the Noise Cooperative who encouraged them to contribute to this song Created the mainland version [40] : 144 . From 2012 to 2018, the non-governmental organization Beijing Workers' Home, founded by Sun Heng, held the "Migrant Workers' Spring Festival Gala" for migrant workers in Pi Village, Jinzhan Township, Chaoyang District, Beijing, and sang this song "Ode to Laborers" every year [61] . However, because the lyrics of "Hymn to Laborers" focus on praising "laborers are the most glorious", they did not highlight the spirit of resistance in the original version and other versions, which caused some controversy [62] .

Thailand 
The Thai version is called " Unity " (Thai: โซลิดาริตี้ , English Solidarity), which was sung by Paradon (Thai: ภราดร ), a Thai female labor band founded in 1993 [63] [37] :142 [40] :148 . It was sung during the 2006 demonstrations against the Thailand-U.S. Free Trade Agreement [64] .

References

Korean music
Minjung
Protest songs
South Korean democracy movements
Chinese democracy movements
Hong Kong democracy movements
Protests in Myanmar
Thai democracy movements